Setina alpestris is a moth in the family Erebidae. It was described by Philipp Christoph Zeller in 1865. It is found in the Alps of Switzerland and Italy.

The wingspan 24–31 mm.

Subspecies
Setina alpestris alpestris
Setina alpestris pseudokuhlweini (Vorbrodt, 1914)
Setina alpestris wolfsbergeri (Burmann, 1975)

References

Moths described in 1865
Endrosina
Taxa named by Philipp Christoph Zeller